The 2019 Caribbean Series (Serie del Caribe) was the 61st edition of the international competition featuring the champions of the Cuban National Series, Dominican Professional Baseball League, Mexican Pacific League, Puerto Rican Professional Baseball League, Panamanian Professional Baseball League, and Venezuelan Professional Baseball League. It took place from February 4 to 10, 2019, at Estadio Nacional de Panamá in Panama City, Panama. The series was originally set to be hosted in Barquisimeto, Venezuela, but for the second consecutive year had to be moved to an alternate location. This was due primarily to security concerns stemming from the 2019 Venezuelan presidential crisis.

The Toros de Herrera won the tournament, becoming the first team from Panama to win since the Carta Vieja Yankees in 1950. It was Panama's first appearance in a Caribbean Series since 1960.

Participating teams

Format
With the addition of a sixth team for the 2019 competition, two groups were formed with each composed of three teams. The groups had their Round-robin, with each team facing the others in their group twice. The teams with the best record from each group advanced to the Final.

Round robin
Time zone Eastern Standard Time (UTC–5)

Group A

Group B

Final

References

External links
Official Site

Caribbean
2019 in Caribbean sport
Caribbean Series
Caribbean Series